Medical Code of Ethics   this document establishing the ethical rules of behaviour of physicians and dental practitioners, defining the priorities of their professional work, showing the principles in the relations with patients, other physicians and the rest of community.

Rules 
The greatest ethical imperative for the physician is the welfare of the patient.

The physician should approach patients with consideration, respecting their personal dignity, right to intimacy and privacy.

The physician should perform all diagnostic, therapeutic and preventive procedures with due exactitude and devoting the necessary time.
 
The physician has the duty to maintain confidentiality. Information obtained in the course of physician's professional duties concerning the patient and his background is to be kept confidential. The death of the patient does not release the physician from the duty of maintaining confidentiality.
 
It is the duty of every physician to continually update and develop professional knowledge and skills as well as to share them with co-workers.

References

External links 
 Código de Deontología Médica. Guía de Ética Médica de España
 Código de Ética Médica do Brasil.
 Kodeks Etyki Lekarskiej (Poland)

Medical ethics